The 2021–22 season was the 90th season in the existence of Stade de Reims and the club's fourth consecutive season in the top flight of French football. In addition to the domestic league, Reims participated in this season's edition of the Coupe de France.

Players

First-team squad

Out on loan

Transfers

In

Out

Pre-season and friendlies

Competitions

Overall record

Ligue 1

League table

Results summary

Results by round

Matches
The league fixtures were announced on 25 June 2021.

Coupe de France

Awards

Stade de Reims Player of the Year

Stade de Reims Player of the Month

References

Stade de Reims seasons
Reims